The following is a list of episodes of the American reality television series, Ax Men, seen on the History channel. The show ended production in 2016 after nine seasons, but returned for a tenth in July 2019.

, 166 episodes of Ax Men have aired.

Series overview

Episodes

Season 1 (2008) 

Season 1 final load counts:
 Browning – 278
 Stump Branch – 132
 Pihl – 130
 Gustafson – 121

Season 2 (2009) 

Season 2 final load counts:
 Rygaard – 690
 Browning – 677
 Pihl – 442
 Conner – 405
 S&S – 8

Season 3 (2010) 

Season 3 final load counts:
 Browning – 1,185
 Rygaard – 1,182
 Pihl – 394 (at end of "Chopping Block")

Season 4 (2010–11) 

Season 4 final load counts:
 Papac – 1,994
 Rygaard – 1,986
 Lemare – 1,642
 Browning – 1,141

Results of the Collins/S&S contest:
 Collins – 26 logs, $7,800 sale proceeds
 S&S – 23 logs, $22,960 sale proceeds

Season 5 (2012) 

Season 5 final load counts:
 Rygaard – 2,231
 Papac – 2,229
 Big Gun – 1,189
 Siderius – 748

 Season 6 (2012–13) Season 6 final load counts: Rygaard – 2,147
 Lemare – 2,132

 Season 7 (2013–14) Season 7 final load counts: Papac – 2,214
 Rygaard – 2,203Final Florida log counts: Dreadknots – 109
 Chapman – 108

 Season 8 (2014–15) Season 8 final load counts: Papac – 2,014
 Rygaard – 2,009
 Triack – 1,997Results of the Chapman/Dreadknots logging contest: Chapman – $266,000
 Dreadknots – $262,000

 Season 9 (2015–16) Note:''' Rygaard is announced as the winner of the season-long "King of the Mountain" rivalry with Papac, but unlike past seasons, no final load counts are given.

Season 10 (2019)

See also 
 Ax Men awards and nominations

References

External links 
 
 

Ax Men